Cecilia Cuțescu-Storck (14 March 1879, in Câineni, Vâlcea – 29 October 1969, in Bucharest) was a Romanian painter with a strong influence on cultural life in the interwar period. She was a promoter of feminism, contributing to the establishment of the "Association of women painters and sculptors" (together with Olga Greceanu and Nina Arbore) and "Feminin artistic circle".

Biography 
Cecilia Cuțescu was born in the village Râul Vadului, in the Câineni commune, Vâlcea County. She was adopted by her maternal grandparents, from which she has the name Cuțescu. She remained however very close to her parents, Natalia and Ion Brăneanu, and her sisters, Fulvia – who died in her teen years – and Ortansa – who became an important feminist activist in Romania.

She graduated from the Central School for Girls in Bucharest, and then continued her studies at Damenakademie, Munich, in 1897. In 1899 she leaves for Paris, taking classes at Académie Julian. Her paintings are introduced to the public through exhibitions held in France and Romania.

Distinctions 
 Medalia de aur si Marele premiu la Expoziția Internațională de la Barcelona (1929)
 Cavaler al Ordinul Meritul Civil, Spania (1930)
 Cavaler al Legiunii de Onoare, Franța (1933)
 Medalia de aur la Expoziția Internațională de la Paris (1937)
 Maestru Emerit al artei în 1957, pentru întreaga activitate artistică.

Authored books 
 Fresca unei vieți, Bucovina, Editura Torouțiu, 1943
 O viață dăruită artei, Editura Meridiane, 1966
 Fresca unei vieți, Editura Vremea, București, 2006

Referenced in books 
 Leon Thevenin: Cecile Coutesco-Storck, sa vie et son oevre, Quatre Chemins, 1932
 Angela Vrancea: Cecilia Cuțescu-Storck, Editura de Stat pentru Literatură și Artă, 1957
 Gabriela Storck și Petre Comarnescu: Cecilia Cuțescu-Storck: Expozitie Retrospectiva, Uniunea Artiștilor Plastici, 1959
 Marin Mihalache: Cecilia Cuțescu-Storck, Editura Meridiane, București, 1969
 Liliana Vârban, Ionel Ionița, Dan Vasiliu: Casa Storck – Muzeul Storck, Muzeul Municipiului București, 2005
 Jeremy Howard: East European Art, Oxford University Press, 2006
 Shona Kallestrup: Art and Design in Romania 1866–1945, Columbia, Eastern European Monographs, 2006
 Aurora Liiceanu: Patru femei, patru povești, Editura Polirom, 2010

In memoriam 
In June 2010, from the initiative of the rector of the Economic Studies Academy of Bucharest, Gheorghe Roșca, and of the mayor of Câineni, Ion Nicolae, a commemorative plaque was placed in the village Râul Vadului.

The Frederic and Cecilia Cuțescu-Storck Art Museum is a modern art museum located in Bucharest, Romania, dedicated to the painter and her husband.

References

Bibliography 
 Cecilia Cuțescu-Storck: Fresca unei vieți, Bucovina, Editura Torouțiu, 1943
 Gabriela Storck si Petre Comărnescu: Cecilia Cuțescu-Storck: Expozitie Retrospectiva, Uniunea Artiștilor Plastici, 1959
 Marin Mihalache: Cecilia Cuțescu-Storck, Editura Meridiane, București, 1969
 Liliana Vârban, Ionel Ionița, Dan Vasiliu: Casa Storck – Muzeul Storck, Muzeul Municipiului București, 2005
 Shona Kallestrup: Art and Design in Romania 1866–1945, Columbia, Eastern European Monographs, 2006

External links 

 Biography of Cecilia Cuțescu-Storck
 http://metropotam.ro/La-zi/2007/01/art7087336963-Muzee-din-Bucuresti-Casa-Storck/
 http://artistiromani.wordpress.com/2008/07/27/cecilia-cutescu-storck-1879-1969/
 http://bucharest.romaniaexplorer.com/page_10865.html
 Vă mai amintiți de: Cecilia Cuțescu-Storck, 1 februarie 2011, Eliza Zdru, Adevărul

1969 deaths
1879 births
Romanian painters
Romanian women painters
Romanian feminists